Amanda Nicole Wilkinson (born January 17, 1982) is a Canadian country music singer.  She was raised in nearby Trenton, Ontario. She is best known for being a member of The Wilkinsons, a trio which also included her father Steve and brother Tyler. She has also recorded with Tyler in the duo Small Town Pistols and as a solo artist.

Biography
Amanda Wilkinson was born in Belleville, Ontario, Canada. She is a member of the country group The Wilkinsons, which includes her father Steve and brother Tyler. She began singing early. Her dad inspired her. They first sang together at a family event and then continued singing together. In 1997, the Wilkinson family moved to Nashville. Their first single "26 Cents" was a success leading to Gold certifications in both the United States and Canada. Other albums The Wilkinsons have released include Here and Now (2000), Highway (2005) and Home (2007).

In 2004, Wilkinson began to sing solo, along with continuing to sing with the family. Her first solo album, Amanda Wilkinson, was released in 2005. In 2006, Wilkinson was nominated for Single of the Year, CMT Video of the Year, Female Artist of the Year and Album of the Year at the Canadian Country Music Awards.

In 2012, Wilkinson and her brother Tyler formed a new country group called Small Town Pistols. The first single they released was called "Colour Blind". Small Town Pistols released an album, Small Town Pistols, in Canada in February 2013.

Discography

Albums

Singles

Music videos

Awards and nominations

Filmography 
The Wilkinsons (TV series) (2006) .... Herself

See also
The Wilkinsons

References

External links 

Canadian Country Music Awards: Walk Away. YouTube Accessed April 10, 2011
Amanda Wilkinson Sings No More Me and You. Receives CCMA's 2005 Chevy Truck Rising Star Award Accessed April 10, 2011
It's Okay to Cry. YouTube Accessed April 10, 2011
Wilkinson Promotional Video at YouTube Accessed April 10, 2011
Nobody Died, school video at YouTube Accessed April 10, 2011
You Heal Me at YouTube Accessed April 10, 2011
When I am Old at YouTube Accessed April 10, 2011
The Wilkinsons Visit College Street School, Quinte Broadcasting see No. 7 Accessed April 10, 2011

1982 births
Living people
People from Belleville, Ontario
Singers from Ontario
Canadian women country singers
Canadian Country Music Association Rising Star Award winners
21st-century Canadian women singers